Dione Joseph is a theatre director and theatre critic based in New Zealand. She founded Black Creatives Aotearoa.

Biography
Joseph is mixed-race, of Caribbean, Anglo-Indian, French and Irish heritage. She moved to New Zealand in 2002 at the age of 14.

Joseph founded community arts organisation Black Creatives Aotearoa to support the creativity of people of African and Afro-Caribbean heritage in New Zealand. The organisation also mentors young talent and develops works by indigenous people and people of colour.

References

Living people
New Zealand theatre directors
Year of birth missing (living people)